Beryl is a mineral.

Beryl may also refer to:

People
 Beryl (given name), and persons with the name
 Beryl (surname)

Fictional characters
 Beryl the Peril, in UK comics
 Beryl (dragon) or Beryllinthranox, in Dragonlance series
 Queen Beryl, in the Sailor Moon franchise

Places
 Beryl, Utah, US
 Beryl Junction, Utah, Iron County, US
 Beryl, West Virginia, Mineral County, West Virginia, US
 1729 Beryl, an asteroid named for Beryl H. Potter

Ships and aircraft
 HMAS Beryl II, a WWII Australian minesweeper
 Beryl-class container ship
 Piel Beryl, a French 2-seater aircraft

Music and television
 "Beryl", a song by Mark Knopfler from the Tracker album
 Beryl, a 2014 play by Maxine Peake about cyclist Beryl Burton
 "Beryl" (The Crown), a TV episode

Technology
 FB Beryl, a Polish rifle
 FB Mini-Beryl, a Polish rifle
 Metropolitan-Vickers Beryl, a jet engine
 Beryl (window manager), part of Compiz software

Other uses
 Beryl (company), a UK cycle light manufacturer
 Béryl incident, a 1962 French nuclear test
 Tropical Storm Beryl, several cyclones

See also
 +Beryll, a clothing accessories brand
 Berel (disambiguation)